Yoshiwara is a 1937 French drama film directed by Max Ophüls and starring Pierre Richard-Willm, Sessue Hayakawa and Michiko Tanaka. It is based on a novel by Maurice Dekobra. The film is set in the Yoshiwara, the red-light district of Tokyo, in the nineteenth century. It depicts a love triangle between a high-class prostitute, a Russian naval officer and a rickshaw man.

Reception
The film was Ophüls' greatest pre-war French financial success. Yoshiwara proved controversial in Japan where the government objected to the depiction of Japanese brothels and banned it. There was a negative reaction against the two Japanese actors who had starred in the film, and they were labelled as traitors.

Cast
 Pierre Richard-Willm – Lieutenant Serge Polenoff 
 Sessue Hayakawa – Ysamo, Kuli 
 Michiko Tanaka – Kohana 
 Roland Toutain – Pawlik 
 Lucienne Le Marchand – Namo  
 André Gabriello – Pô
 Camille Bert – Le commandant 
 Foun-Sen – Geisha 
 Philippe Richard – L'attaché russe 
 Ky Duyen – L'agent secret 
 Georges Saillard – Le médecin

References

Bibliography
 Bacher, Lutz. Max Ophuls in the Hollywood Studios. Rutgers University Press, 1996.
 Seigle, Cecilia Segawa. Yoshiwara: The Glittering World of the Japanese Courtesan. University of Hawaii Press, 1993.

External links

1937 films
French drama films
1930s French-language films
Films directed by Max Ophüls
Films based on French novels
Films set in Tokyo
French black-and-white films
Films scored by Paul Dessau
1937 drama films
Japan in non-Japanese culture
Cockfighting in film
1930s French films